Ignacio Rambla (born 2 January 1964) is a Spanish equestrian and Olympic medalist. He was born in Jerez de la Frontera. He won a silver medal in dressage at the 2004 Summer Olympics in Athens.

References

1964 births
Living people
Sportspeople from Jerez de la Frontera
Spanish male equestrians
Olympic equestrians of Spain
Olympic silver medalists for Spain
Equestrians at the 1996 Summer Olympics
Equestrians at the 2004 Summer Olympics
Olympic medalists in equestrian
Medalists at the 2004 Summer Olympics
20th-century Spanish people